Ian Robb is an English-born folk singer and songwriter, currently based in Ottawa, Ontario. He was a founding member of Friends of Fiddler's Green, and a columnist for Sing Out! He is also a member of the Canadian folk trio Finest Kind. He wrote a parody of Stan Rogers song "Barrett's Privateers", titled "Garnet's Homemade Beer".  He was the recipient of the 2005 Canadian Folk Music Award for Best Traditional Singer, for his work on the CD Jiig.

Notable songs written by Robb
 "They're Taking It Away"
 "The Old Rose and Crown"
 "Garnet's HomeMade Beer"
 "Diana" (commemorating Lady Diana's 1981 marriage to Prince Charles)

Recordings
 Solo CDs
 Ian Robb and Hang the Piper,  Folk-Legacy Records
 Rose and Crown,  Folk-Legacy Records
 From Different Angels, 1994

CDs as part of Finest Kind
 Lost in a Song 1996
 Heart's Delight 1999
 Silks& Spices 2004
 Feasts & Spirits (with John D. Huston) 2004
 For Honour & For Gain 2010
Other CDs
 Ian Robb and Hang the Piper with Grit Laskin, Seamus McGuire, John Goodman, Terry Rudden, 1979
 Margaret Christl & Ian Robb with Grit Laskin The Barley Grain for Me 1998

CD as part of jJiig
  Jiig 2005

References

External links

Bibliography
 Schmid, Will. (1987). New Folk Favorites: For Guitar, Vocal, Acoustic Instruments. Milwaukee, WI: Hal Leonard Publishing Corp., (Ian Robb entry page 17)

Canadian folk singers
Canadian male singers
English emigrants to Canada
Living people
Musicians from Ottawa
Canadian Folk Music Award winners
Year of birth missing (living people)